Amor salvaje (Wild Love) is a Mexican drama film directed by Juan Orol. It was released in 1950 and starring Rosa Carmina and Víctor Junco.

Plot
Alma Luz (Rosa Carmina) leaves Panama to go live with her aunt Antonia (Dalia Iñiguez) and Manuel (Victor Junco), her husband in México. There she meets Julio (José Pulido), who tries to conquer her, but she rejects him because she is in love with Manuel. Julio to learn the relationship between her and her uncle, faces Manuel causing a tragedy.

Cast
 Rosa Carmina ... Alma Luz
 Víctor Junco ... Manuel
 Dalia Iñiguez ... Antonia
 José Pulido ... Julio
 Wolf Ruvinskis
 Juanita Riverón

Reviews
About this film the Cuban-Mexican actress Rosa Carmina reveals: This film has a very strong argument to something like La Malquerida. An insane love between the niece and the aunt's husband. At that time this was very strong, now we die of laughter. The argument was written by José G. Cruz. We shot a lot with José G. Cruz; he is a person who has the gift to reach out to the people, to the public. He has that magic wand to know what you like and what you dislike. His arguments are classic comics of the popular culture.

In this film Rosa Carmina dances a Joropo that was written  for her:

I'm going to Havana and never come back, because Carmina's love will kill me...

Rosa Carmina also revealed: I learned to dance joropo, wearing maracas in my sandals and poured sugar on the floor to set the pace.

References

External links
 
 Amor salvaje in FilmAffinity.

1950 films
Mexican black-and-white films
Rumberas films
1950s Spanish-language films
Films directed by Juan Orol
Mexican drama films
1950 drama films
1950s Mexican films